Visqueen may refer to:

Visqueen, a brand of plastic sheeting
Visqueen (album), by American noise rock band Unsane
Visqueen (band), an American power pop band